George Frederick Marter (6 June 1840 – 10 May 1907) was a politician in the Canadian province of Ontario.  He led the Ontario Conservative Party from 1894 to 1896. Marter and Patrick Brown are the only permanent Ontario Conservative leaders who did not lead the party into an election.

Early career
After graduating from grammar school in Brantford Marter became a merchant and county councillor in Norfolk County, but later moved to operate a general store Bracebridge, Ontario.

Politics
Marter was elected for the riding of Muskoka from 1886 to 1894 and Toronto North from 1894 to 1902.

In 1894, Marter became Conservative leader following William Ralph Meredith's acceptance of the position of Chief Justice of the Common Pleas. The Conservative Party he led was aligned with the Protestant Protective Association in the legislature, and was divided by religious conflict and narrow bigotry. Marter was essentially an interim leader.

In 1896, he was replaced as leader by James P. Whitney. He was defeated when he ran as an Independent in the 1902 election.

Later life

Following his political career Marter became an insurance agent/manager of the London and Lancashire Insurance Company of Toronto and later co-founder of Marter Hall Company Limited with his son. Marter died in Toronto in 1907.

Legacy
Marter Township, Ontario is named for him.

References

Notes

Citations

External links
 
Biography at the Dictionary of Canadian Biography Online
The Canadian men and women of the time : a handbook of Canadian biography HJ Morgan (1898)

1840 births
1907 deaths
Canadian Methodists
Leaders of the Progressive Conservative Party of Ontario
Progressive Conservative Party of Ontario MPPs